Henry M. Fox (November 15, 1844 – March 3, 1923) was a Union soldier during the American Civil War, and a Medal of Honor recipient.

Early life
Fox was born on 15 November 1844 in Ohio to Peter Fox and Elizabeth Miller.  He married Hannah Burdick in Coldwater, Michigan on 1 June 1867. He had five daughters and one son.

Military career
Fox enlisted in company M, 5th Michigan Cavalry on August 12, 1862, at Coldwater, Michigan for a period of three years.

Mustered August 30, 1862, Fox was promoted to corporal August 2, 1863, first sergeant January 1, 1865, and to second lieutenant April 4, 1865.

Mustered out at Fort Leavenworth, Kansas, June 19, 1865, Fox lived in Union, Michigan, after the war.

Death
Fox died of Influenza in Elkhart, Indiana, on 3 March 1923 at the age of 78, and is buried at Mottville Township Cemetery.

Medal of Honor
On September 19, 1864, during the Third Battle of Winchester at Winchester, Virginia, Fox captured the Confederate battle flag.

Henry M. Fox's official Medal of Honor citation reads:
Rank and organization: Sergeant, Company M, 5th Michigan Cavalry. 
Place and date: At Winchester, Va., 19 September 1864.  
Entered service at: Coldwater, Mich. 
Born: 1844, Trumbull, Ohio. 
Date of issue: 27 September 1864. 
Citation:
The President of the United States of America, in the name of Congress, takes pleasure in presenting the Medal of Honor to Sergeant Henry M. Fox, United States Army, for extraordinary heroism on 19 September 1864, while serving with Company M, 5th Michigan Cavalry, in action at Winchester, Virginia, for capture of flag.

Sgt. Fox was one of two members of the 5th Michigan Cavalry to receive the Medal of Honor for this action. The other was Corporal Gabriel Cole.

Flag to War Department
On September 28, 1864 Henry along with 6 other men presented the captured flags to the Secretary of War at the War Department.

George Reynolds Company I, 6th New York Cavalry
Patrick McEnmore, 6th New York Cavalry
Corporal Chester B. Bowen, Company I, New York dragoons
George E. Mesch, 56th New York Cavalry
 Gabriel Cole, Company I, 5th Michigan Cavalry
Andrew J. Lorish Regimental commissary Sergeant 1st New York Cavalry

After the presentation the Secretary stated:"I return to you, gentlemen, the thanks of this department, for the valor and gallantry you have displayed in the capture of these flags. I will direct the Adjutant general to furnish you with medals, with your name inscribed thereon, and they will be sent to your commanders for delivery to you, as soon as they can be prepared. The Adjutant General will take charge of these flags and place them among the archives of the Department."

See also

 List of Medal of Honor recipients
 List of American Civil War Medal of Honor recipients: A–F

References

External links
 

1844 births
1923 deaths
Union Army soldiers
United States Army Medal of Honor recipients
People of Michigan in the American Civil War
People from Coldwater, Michigan
American Civil War recipients of the Medal of Honor
People from Ashtabula County, Ohio